The Delilah missile is a cruise missile or loitering munition developed in Israel by Israel Military Industries (IMI). Unlike a typical cruise missile, which is locked onto a pre-programmed target prior to launch, the Delilah missile's unique feature, as claimed by the manufacturer, is being able to loiter and surveil an area before a remote weapon systems officer, usually from the launching fighter aircraft, identifies the specific target of the attack.

Overview 
The name Delilah had been used by an anti-radiation attack drone configured after the US MQM-74 Chukar aerial target. It entered service in the Israeli Air Force in the mid-1980s. This air-launched drone identifies radar sites, allowing them to be found and destroyed. The Delilah missile is the name of a missile family built by IMI. Delilah was initially created as an aerial decoy, and was later developed into an offensive strike weapon in the 1990s, used by Israeli F-16 and upgraded F-4E attack aircraft. It is multi-platform and has multi-target capability. Its uses include Air-to-Surface (AS) and Surface-to-Surface (SS), targeting ground targets, vehicles and sea vessels, either stationary or moving. It is classed as a Medium Range, Multi-Purpose Guided Missile (MRMPGM), as All-in-One.

The Delilah is an air-launched stand-off missile and cruise missile with a range of 250 km. It can be fitted with a variety of warheads which can be targeted on both land and sea targets. It has a turbo jet engine that is able to loiter, allowing it to target well-hidden threats in addition to moving targets. Its maneuverability makes the missile ideal for destroying surface-to-air missile threats. The on-board autopilot and inertial navigation/global positioning navigation systems (INS/GPS) allow the missile to perform its mission autonomously. A data link enables intervention and target validation. The Delilah missile was first used in combat by Israel over Lebanon in July and August 2006 and launched by F-16D fighter aircraft. The missile can be fired from most aircraft, helicopters, or ground launchers. Its compact dimensions allow it to be carried by the Sikorsky UH-60 Black Hawk and SH-60B helicopters.

Delilah-GL missile
The Delilah-GL is a ground-launched version of the Delilah cruise missile that has a range of 250 km. It is equipped with a 30 kg conventional explosive warhead. It can be modified to carry other payloads, such as infrared target seeking and guidance devices. It is guided by GPS and has the ability to loiter in the target area, before confirming the target through real-time visual intelligence.

Operational history
On 9 May 2018, Delilah missiles were fired at Syrian and Iranian targets, including anti-aircraft systems, such as SA-5 and SA-2 units.

Operators

Current operator

References

External links

 Delilah-AL on IMI website 
 Delilah-SL on IMI website , Brochure 
 Delilah-HL on IMI website 
 Delilah-GL on IMI website , Brochure 
 Delilah AL and Delilah HL, Air-to-surface missiles - Stand-off and cruise
 Delilah Precision Surface Attack Weapon 
 Delilah - The IAF Loitering Missile 
 Israel used Delilah missile in Lebanon

Cruise missiles
Cruise missiles of Israel
Guided missiles of Israel
Military equipment introduced in the 1990s